Callarge  is an east Asian genus of satyrine butterflies endemic to (China). Callarge  appear to be mimics of species in the Danaini genus Parantica. The genus apparently approaches Zethera, a genus of the Indo-Australian butterflies consisting of but few species, some of which are strongly mimetic.

Species
Callarge occidentalis Leech, 1890
Callarge sagitta (Leech, 1890)

External links

"Callarge Leech, [1892]" at Markku Savela's Lepidoptera and Some Other Life Forms

Satyrinae
Butterfly genera
Taxa named by John Henry Leech